The 1915–16 National Challenge Cup was the third tournament of the modern-day Lamar Hunt U.S. Open Cup. Bethlehem Steel won its second consecutive championship. The entries for the competition were to be made by midnight September 30, 1915. The draw for the qualifying and first rounds was made on October 2, 1915. The tournament schedule was originally set for the qualifying round to take place on or before October 24; first round, November 14; second round, December 12; third round, January 16, 1916; fourth round, March 5; semis, April 2, and final on April 30.

Bracket
Home teams listed on top of bracket

a) aggregate after 3 games
b) forfeit replay

Final

 Bill Duncan
 Sam Fletcher
 Jock Ferguson
 Thomas Murray
 James Campbell
 Bob Morrison (c)
 Samuel MacDonald
 Fred Pepper
 Neil Clarke
 Paddy Butler
 Tommy Fleming
 Manager:  Horace Lewis
 Chick Albin
 Frank Booth
 Charles Burns
 Frederick Burns
 Pierre Bouchard
 William Stone
 Arthur Morgan
 John Sullivan
 John Dalton
 Thomas Swords (c)
 Oliva Garant
 Manager:  Randolph Howarth

See also
1916 American Cup

Sources
USOpenCup.com

External links
 Open Cup Finals

Nat
U.S. Open Cup
1916 domestic association football cups